Iceland experienced one of its deadliest outbreaks of smallpox beginning in 1707. The epidemic ultimately killed around 12,000 Icelanders, close to one-quarter of the island's population at the time.

Iceland in 1707 
Iceland in 1707 was a territory of the Kingdom of Denmark with 53,681 people according to one tally of the 1703 census. Epidemic diseases like smallpox did not naturally sustain themselves on the island due to the relatively sparse population, but frequent trade and travel with Denmark presented a vulnerability to cross-Atlantic spread of contagious diseases. Smallpox had crossed the ocean before in 1670, causing a two-year epidemic, and since then a new generation of people had developed with no immunity to the disease.

Epidemic 

In 1707 smallpox arrived in Iceland aboard a ship from Denmark when a passenger fell sick and died with the disease. Despite being buried at sea, the index case's contaminated clothing remained and infected at least one other person on board. The next year it had spread to almost every town across Iceland. The last reported cases were in the spring of 1709. Ultimately, the outbreak may have killed a quarter of the population of Iceland at the time.

References 

18th-century epidemics
Smallpox epidemics
18th century in Iceland
1707 in Europe
Disease outbreaks in Iceland
1707 disasters